Raúl Oscar Belén (Roldán, Santa Fe, 1 July 1931 – 2 August 2010) was an Argentine football forward who played for Argentina in the 1962 FIFA World Cup. He also played for Racing Club de Avellaneda.

Biography 
Belén gave his first steps as footballer in Newell's Old Boys, where he played from 1951 to 1956. Nevertheless, he is mostly known for his tenure on Racing Club de Avellaneda, where he played 174 matches scoring 42 goals. Belén's highlights with Newell's were two goals v Rosario Central that helped his team to win both matches. Some of his teammates there were Jorge Griffa and José Yudica.

Belén was part of the first tours that teams outside Buenos Aires went on Europe, playing with Newell's some friendly matches in Netherlands and Luxembourg. After he suffered tuberculosis during one of those tours, Belén had to leave football for one year, but as his performances deceased due to the illness, Newell's executives decided to cancel his contract. As a result, he moved to Buenos Aires to play for Racing Club de Avellaneda.

Although Belén started playing as midfielder, he gained recognition as left-winger, after Racing Club coach José Della Torre moved him to that position, although he denied playing as winger at the beginning. Because of his performance at the 1959 South American Championship, Belén was considered the best left-winger of the competition.

Belén had 31 caps for the Argentina national team, scoring 8 goals. He was part of the team at the two editions of 1959 Copa América (in Argentina and Ecuador, where he was champion and runner-up, respectively). Belén also won the 1960 Panamerican Championship, being also one of the top scorers of Argentina along with Osvaldo Nardiello. Belén was part of the team that participated in the 1962 FIFA World Cup in Chile.

Titles
Racing
 Primera División (2): 1958, 1961

Argentina
 Copa América (1): 1959 (A)
 Panamerican Championship (1): 1960

References

1931 births
2010 deaths
Argentine footballers
Argentina international footballers
Association football forwards
Racing Club de Avellaneda footballers
1962 FIFA World Cup players
Copa América-winning players
Sportspeople from Santa Fe Province